Victoria Vanessa Mboko (born 26 August 2006) is an American-born Canadian tennis player of Congolese descent.

Mboko has a career high WTA singles ranking of 516 achieved on 1 August 2022.

Mboko made her WTA main draw debut at the 2022 National Bank Open in the doubles draw partnering Kayla Cross.

Mboko reached the finals of two Grand Slam junior tournaments in 2022, losing in the finals of the doubles competitions at the Australian Open and at Wimbledon.

ITF Circuit finals

Singles: 2 (1 title, 1 runner-up)

References

External links

2006 births
Living people
Black Canadian sportspeople
Canadian female tennis players
American emigrants to Canada
Sportspeople from Charlotte, North Carolina
Canadian people of Democratic Republic of the Congo descent